Lake Iroquois is a  reservoir in northwestern Vermont, bordered by three towns: Hinesburg, Williston, and Richmond.
   
Lake Iroquois (formerly known as Hinesburg pond) was created in 1867 to supply mills in Hinesburg with a better water supply. Building a dam on Pond Brook caused the existing spring-fed pond to rise above its banks and become the current lake. The towns share a beach on the lake, plus there is a public boat access.

External links 
Lake Iroquois Association 
Town of Williston: Lake Iroquois Home Page
Picture of Lake Iroquois
Lake Depth Chart

Hinesburg, Vermont
Richmond, Vermont
Williston, Vermont
Iroquois
Protected areas of Chittenden County, Vermont
Iroquois